Roberto Gervaso (9 July 1937 – 2 June 2020) was an Italian writer and journalist. He won the Premio Bancarella twice: for L'Italia dei Comuni in 1967, and for Cagliostro in 1973.

Gervaso was born in Turin where he grew up. He started working as an editor and staff writer at Corriere della Sera in 1960. He subsequently moved to Rome where he became a freelance journalist and columnist, contributing to Il Mattino, Il Messaggero and Il Giornale.

In the late 1960s Gervaso co-authored with his mentor and former editor at Corriere, Indro Montanelli, six of the nine volumes of Storia d'Italia. In the mid-1970s he worked as a broadcaster and television presenter at RAI and Canale 5.

Selected works
Italy in the Golden Centuries (with Indro Montanelli), Regnery Publishing, Washington DC, 1967
Cagliostro: A Biography, Victor Gollancz Ltd, London, 1974
Claretta: The Woman Who Died for Mussolini, Summerstown Books, London, 2002

References

1937 births
2020 deaths
Writers from Rome
20th-century Italian writers
21st-century Italian writers
20th-century Italian journalists
21st-century Italian journalists
Journalists from Turin
Italian newspaper editors